Edwin Ferdon (June 14, 1913 – November 13, 2002) was an American ethnologist noted for his studies of the people of the Americas and Polynesia. Ferdon attained his bachelor's degree from the University of Minnesota and his master's degree from the University of California. During his lifetime, Ferdon participated in field work in Peru, Bolivia, Mexico, Ecuador, and Easter Island. While he was not in the field, he worked in museums, including the Museum of New Mexico as a curator and the Museum of International Folk Art as the director. Ferdon died on November 13, 2002, at the age of 89.

Early life
Edwin Nelson Ferdon Jr. was born on June 14, 1913, in St. Paul, Minnesota. He had two sisters and a brother. Ferdon's family moved to Coshocton, Ohio, where he attended high school. While in Ohio, he also participated in Boy Scouts of America and became an Eagle Scout.

He attended the University of Minnesota and graduated in 1937. While in school, he went to do field work in Peru and Bolivia in 1935, and later went to Mexico in 1936 and again in 1937. Ferdon's brother, John, was killed at the age of 17 due to a radio that fell into the bath water in 1936 while Ferdon was away in Mexico City.

Career
After graduation, he worked for the Museum of New Mexico in Santa Fe, New Mexico as a curator until 1938. He left that job in order to do fieldwork in Ecuador for three years where he conducted archaeological surveys. He went on to attend the University of California to obtain a master's degree.

In 1955, Thor Heyerdahl asked Ferdon to go on an expedition to Easter Island as an archaeologist. Ferdon was one of four archaeologists who went on the expedition. While in Eastern Polynesia, Ferdon studied the walking rituals and the details of modern life in Tahiti. Ferdon also took many photographs to document the expedition. He published many books and articles on his studies. Ferdon worked for the Arizona State Museum at the University of Arizona and retired in 1983, after serving as associate director. During his career as an anthropologist and archaeologist, he was also the director of the Museum of International Folk Art in Santa Fe.

Ferdon died on November 13, 2002, due to cancer. He is buried at the East Lawn Cemetery in Tucson, Arizona.

Publications

References

External links
Edwin Ferdon slides and negatives of Mesoamerica and Southern Mexico, MSS 536 at L. Tom Perry Special Collections, Brigham Young University

1913 births
2002 deaths
Writers from Saint Paul, Minnesota
Ethnologists
American ethnologists
University of Minnesota alumni
Harold B. Lee Library-related photography articles
University of California alumni
University of Arizona staff